Pordum is a surname. Notable people with this surname include:

 Francis J. Pordum (born 1945), American politician
 Frederick F. Pordum, American politician